Episcepsis satania is a moth of the family Erebidae. It was described by William Schaus in 1924. It is found in Mexico.

References

Euchromiina
Moths described in 1924